The Colisée de Trois-Rivières is an arena in Trois-Rivières, Quebec, Canada. It has a capacity of 3500, with 2700 seated. It opened in 1938. The Colisée was home to the Trois-Rivières Draveurs of the QMJHL from 1969 to 1992. From 2004 to 2018, the building hosted an LNAH franchise that went by many names but was also called the Draveurs when it ceased operations.  It is the home venue of the UQTR Patriotes university hockey team.

In the late 2010s, construction started on Colisée Vidéotron in District 55, which opened in September 2021.

References

Indoor ice hockey venues in Canada
Indoor arenas in Quebec
Sports venues in Trois-Rivières
Quebec Major Junior Hockey League arenas
University sports venues in Canada
1938 establishments in Quebec
Sports venues completed in 1938